Mi Vida Eres Tú (Eng:You're My Life) is a studio album released by the Mexican romantic ensemble Los Temerarios. It was nominated for Regional Mexican Album of the Year at the Lo Nuestro Awards of 1993.

Track listing

Album certification

References

Los Temerarios albums
1992 albums